Methochinae is a small subfamily of solitary wasps in the family Thynnidae, whose larvae are parasitoids of various tiger beetle larvae.

Genera
 Methocha Latreille, 1804
 Pterombrus Smith, 1869

References